Maxime Le Bailly, comtesse de La Falaise (25 June 1922 – 30 April 2009), was an English 1950s model, and, in the 1960s, an underground movie actress. She was also a cookery writer and "food maven" as well as a fashion designer for Blousecraft, Chloé and Gérard Pipart. In her later years she pursued a career as a furniture and interior designer.

Early life
She was born 22 June 1922 in West Dean, West Sussex, England as Maxine Birley into a family of successful artists, businesspeople and academics. She grew up in Hampstead, and later at Charleston Manor, East Sussex. Her father, Sir Oswald Birley (1880–1952), was a celebrated portrait painter known for his portraits of royalty and others. Her mother was Rhoda Vava Mary Lecky Pike, of County Carlow, a gardener and successful artist. Maxine's brother, Mark Birley (1930–2007), became an entrepreneur known for his investments in the hospitality industry.

She changed her first name to Maxime after her first marriage, to French aristocrat Alain Le Bailly de La Falaise, in 1946. She was known as Maxime de La Falaise McKendry, for a while, after her second marriage to John McKendry, Curator of Prints and Drawings at the Metropolitan Museum.

Career
During the Second World War, she worked as a minor codebreaker at Bletchley Park, before being invalided out after developing kleptomania.

Fashion
In the 1950s, Maxime de La Falaise worked for Elsa Schiaparelli as a vendeuse mondaine which she explained as "a sort of muse who was supposed to encourage sales to the rich English". She modelled for photographers such as Jack Robinson and Cecil Beaton.

She "dressed with uninhibited chic" and according to The Independent, Cecil Beaton once called her "the only truly chic Englishwoman".

Writing
While living in New York Maxime de La Falaise wrote a food column for Vogue magazine. In 1980, she published a collection of these columns, with her own illustrations, under the title Food in Vogue. In 1973 she published Seven Centuries of English Cooking: A Collection of Recipes. She also wrote the foreword to My Kingdom of Books (1999) by Richard Booth.

Andy Warhol
Andy Warhol envisioned Maxime de La Falaise as part of Andy Warhol's Nothing Serious, his 1971 video project designed for television. Warhol included her along with such personalities as Candy Darling and Brigid Berlin in his 1973 black-and-white video Phoney (later incorporated into the 1991 Andy Warhol's Video & Television Retrospective),.

She also appeared in the 1974 film Blood for Dracula (not made by Warhol despite being titled Andy Warhol's Dracula in the US and West Germany).

According to the New York Times in 1977, Warhol had La Falaise design a menu for Andymat, Warhol's version of the automat, which included onion tarts, shepherds' pie, fish cakes, Irish lamb stew, key lime pie and a "nursery cocktail"  of milk on the rocks. Her association with Warhol was such that one source called her "The Factory mother".

Personal life
They divorced in 1950, following a series of her infidelities, including an affair with British ambassador Duff Cooper. They had two children:
Louise Vava Lucia Henriette ("Loulou") Le Bailly de La Falaise (1947—2011), who also became a fashion model and, later, a muse to Yves Saint Laurent and a fashion designer herself. Loulou de La Falaise's first husband was Desmond FitzGerald, 29th Knight of Glin, with whom she had no children; they married in 1966, separated in 1967, and divorced in 1970. In 1977, she married the writer Thadée Klossowski de Rola, a son of the painter Balthus, by whom she had a daughter: Anna Klossowski de Rola.
Alexis Richard Dion Oswald Le Bailly de La Falaise, (1948-2004) was a furniture designer who also appeared in the Warhol film Tub Girls. Alexis' had two children: Daniel de La Falaise, is a chef, food writer, and photographer, and is married to Molly Malone; and Lucie de La Falaise, is a model, and is married to Marlon Richards, son of Keith Richards and Anita Pallenberg.

Maxime de La Falaise married, as her second husband, John McKendry, curator of prints and photography at the Metropolitan Museum of Art, who died in 1975. During the marriage it has been suggested that he had an affair with photographer Robert Mapplethorpe, while she had one with J. Paul Getty III, artist Max Ernst, and film director Louis Malle. La Falaise is said to have aided Mapplethorpe's entry "into high society, European and American."

Maxime de La Falaise died of natural causes, aged 86, at her home in Saint-Rémy-de-Provence, Provence, on 30 April 2009.

References

External links
 Maxime de La Falaise – Daily Telegraph obituary

1922 births
2009 deaths
People from West Dean, West Sussex
English fashion designers
English female models
English writers
English emigrants to France
Birley family
Bletchley Park women
French countesses
Le Bailly de La Falaise family
British women fashion designers
20th-century English businesspeople